Synaphea bifurcata is a shrub endemic to Western Australia.

The leaves have lobes with incisions that extend more than half-way toward the midrib, are deeply forked with a cuneate or fan shape, that is once or twice bifurcate. It blooms between September and November producing yellow flowers. The stigma in the flower is entire to emarginate or 2-lobed to less than a half and the ovary has an apical ring of translucent glands.

The species was first formally described in 1995 by the botanist Alexander Segger George in P.M.McCarthy's work Appendix: Synaphea as published in the journal Flora of Australia.

It is found in the Wheatbelt region of Western Australia between Ravensthorpe and Lake Grace where it grows in sandy-clay-loam soils over laterite.

References

Eudicots of Western Australia
bifurcata
Endemic flora of Western Australia
Plants described in 1995